La Trinitaria (The Trinity) was a secret society founded in  Juan Pablo Duarte's home situated in what today is known as  Arzobispo Nouel Street, across from the "Del Carmen's Church" in the then occupied Santo Domingo, the current capital of the Dominican Republic. The founder, Juan Pablo Duarte and a group of like minded young people, led the struggle to establish the Dominican Republic as a free, sovereign, and independent nation in the 19th century. Their goal was to protect their newly liberated country from any foreign invasion. They helped bring about the end of the Haitian occupation of Santo Domingo from 1822 to 1844.

History

La Trinitaria was established on July 16, 1838 by Juan Pablo Duarte in the house of Juan Isidro Pérez de la Paz. Some of its first members included Juan Isidro Pérez, Pedro Alejandro Pina, Jacinto de la Concha, Félix María Ruiz, José María Serra, Benito González, Felipe Alfau, and Juan Nepomuceno Ravelo. The society also conceptualized and designed the flag of the Dominican Republic.

Duarte and his followers also founded the societies La Filantrópica and La Dramática, a more visible organization than La Trinitaria, which spread its separatist ideas by staging theatrical events. Duarte saw how Spain used theatre to raise public sentiment and keep spirits high and as a result, wanted to bring it to the Dominican Republic. 

Hoping to increase nationalism, the members of these two groups would rehearse theatre acts in people's homes and perform in front of hundreds in La Carcel Vieja ("The Old Jail", which today houses the Museo de la Catedral). These performances would help ease tension within the people of the Dominican Republic and it was within these performances that group would push revolutionary agendas. For example, Pérez called for a revolution during one performance and the whole crowd cheered and gave a standing ovation. Unfortunately for the revolutionary movement and for Duarte, he was forced into exile in August 1843 as a result of his dissident activities.

La Trinitaria's other members continued the fight in Duarte's absence. One of them was Francisco del Rosario Sánchez, who corresponded with Duarte during the latter's exile in Venezuela, and Matías Ramón Mella, who along with Duarte and Sanchez became known as the founding fathers of the Dominican Republic.

On January 16, 1844 La Trinitaria's manifesto in favor of independence was released, and the fight for independence began to gain the necessary momentum. On the heels of La Trinitaria's work, and after many battles and much bloodshed, the Dominican Republic was born on February 27, 1844, claiming independence from Haiti with a declaration at the Puerta del Conde.

The involvement of La Trinitaria is also seen in the early formation of the new republic. Yet for the most part the society's ideology, which was in sync with Duarte's, was not implemented, as Pedro Santana forcibly took the reins of the newly formed nation and exiled Duarte. As a result, Santana enacted re-colonization of the country by Spain, making it the only former colony of the Americas to do so.

Members of Secret Society La Trinitaria 

 Juan Pablo Duarte - (1813–1876) was a Spanish-Dominican military leader, writer, activist, and nationalist politician who was the foremost of the founding fathers of the Dominican Republic.
 Matías Ramón Mella - (1816–1864) was a Spanish-Dominican revolutionary, politician, and military general.
 Francisco del Rosario Sánchez - (1817–1861) was a politician and revolutionary
 Tomás Bobadilla - (1785–1871) was a Spanish-Dominican writer, intellectual and politician. The first ruler of the Dominican Republic.
 Juan Isidro Pérez -​ (1817-1868) was a Spanish-Dominican revolutionary, politician.
 Pedro Alejandro Pina - (1820-1870) was a Spanish-Dominican military leader and politician. 
 Antonio Duvergé - (1807–1855) was a French-Dominican general who is one of the most legendary military figures in the history of the Dominican Republic.

Other usage

Today, La Trinitaria may also refer to the three founding fathers of the Dominican Republic. The usage is a play on words whereby the concept of the Trinity is overlapped with the establishment of one nation by the three founding fathers: Duarte, Sánchez, and Mella.

References

History of the Dominican Republic
Dominican War of Independence
Dominican Republic nationalists
Dominican Republic political people 
Secret societies
Organizations established in 1838
1838 establishments in Haiti